A by-election to the French National Assembly was held in French Cameroons on 23 June 1957. The election was held after the resignation of Alexandre Douala Manga Bell, the holder of the second seat in the second college. Bell was re-elected with 33% of the vote.

Results

References

Cameroon
Elections in Cameroon
By-election
Cameroon by-election, 1957
Cameroon by-election